Cistalia is a genus of dirt-colored seed bugs in the family Rhyparochromidae. There are about eight described species in Cistalia.

Species
These eight species belong to the genus Cistalia:
 Cistalia alboannulata (Stal, 1858)
 Cistalia binotata Slater & Baranowski, 1973
 Cistalia explanata Barber, 1938
 Cistalia micans Slater & O'Donnell, 1978
 Cistalia neotropicalis Slater & Baranowski, 1973
 Cistalia pallidifemur Cervantes & Gámez-Virués, 2006
 Cistalia parva Dellapé, Melo & O’Donnell, 2015
 Cistalia signoretii (Guerin-Meneville, 1857)

References

Rhyparochromidae
Articles created by Qbugbot